Phyllostachys angusta  is a species of bamboo found in Anhui, Fujian, Henan, Jiangsu, Zhejiang provinces of China.

References

External links
 
 

angusta
Flora of China